Ann Firbank (born 9 January 1933) is an actress of film, television, and stage whose career extends from 1956. One of Firbank's more notable roles is her 1971 portrayal of Anne Elliot in the serial Persuasion, an adaptation of Jane Austen's novel of the same name.

Career
Firbank starred as Anne Elliot in the ITV serial Persuasion, a 1971 adaptation of the Jane Austen novel of the same name. Her film credits include the 1967 film Accident, The Scarlet Pimpernel (1982) and Anna and the King (1999). In 2005, Firbank appeared in the costume drama Elizabeth I alongside Dame Helen Mirren.

Firbank appeared in a 2012 production of The Golden Dragon at the Jagriti Theatre in Bangalore, India. A reviewer for The Hindu praised Firbank's performance, writing that the "energetic and youthful at 79" actress "stands out for her stage presence". In 2014, Firbank appeared in a production of the play The Crucible at the Old Vic, playing Rebecca Nurse.

Personal life
She had been engaged to the actor Patric Doonan, when he was married to actress Aud Johansen. Doonan committed suicide in 1958.

Select filmography
Film
 Carry On Nurse (1958) as Staff Nurse Helen Lloyd
 Nothing Barred (1961) as Lady Katherine
 Darling (1965) as Sybil Martin
 A Man Could Get Killed (1966) as Miss Nolan
 Accident (1967) as Laura
 A Severed Head (1970) as Rosemary Lynch-Gibbon 
 Sunday Bloody Sunday (1971) as Party Guest
 Asylum (1972) as Anna
 Brief Encounter (1974) as Melanie Harvey
 The Scarlet Pimpernel (1982) as Countess de Tournay
 A Passage to India (1984) as Mrs. Callendar
 Foreign Body (1986) as Mrs Plumb
 Anna and the King (1999) as Lady Bradley
 Star Wars: The Rise of Skywalker (2019) as Tatooine Elder

Television
 Kenilworth (1957) as Amy Robsart
 Leave It to Todhunter (1958) as Felicity Farroway
 Emergency-Ward 10 (1960–63) as Mary Nesbitt
 The Plane Makers (1964–65) as Pamela Wilder
 Persuasion (1971) as Anne Elliot
 The Nearly Man (1975) as Alice Collinson
 Space 1999 (1977) as Consul Varda in "The Dorcons"
 Lillie (1978) as Queen Alexandra
 Crown Court (1973–75, 1981) as Sarah Gibson 
  Problem at Sea (1989) as Miss Henderson
 Bergerac (1989) S7E4 The Other Woman as Sheila King
 Heartbeat (1993) S2, E2, End of the Line as Agnes Tripp
 Elizabeth I (2005) as Lady Anne
  Midsomer Murders  (2009)  The Black Book as Felicity Law
 New Tricks "Ghosts" (2014) as Nancy Evans

Theatre
 Billy Liar, West Yorkshire Playhouse (2010)
 The Golden Dragon, Jagriti Theatre (2012)
 The Crucible, the Old Vic (2014)
 Blood Wedding, the Young Vic (2019)

References

External links 
 

Living people
1933 births
British film actresses
British television actresses
British stage actresses